The 1979 Polish Speedway season was the 1979 season of motorcycle speedway in Poland.

Individual

Polish Individual Speedway Championship
The 1979 Individual Speedway Polish Championship final was held on 22 July at Gorzów.

Golden Helmet
The 1979 Golden Golden Helmet organised by the Polish Motor Union (PZM) was the 1979 event for the league's leading riders. It was held over 4 rounds.

Junior Championship
 winner - Mariusz Okoniewski

Silver Helmet
 winner - Roman Jankowski

Bronze Helmet
 winner - Józef Kafel

Pairs

Polish Pairs Speedway Championship
The 1979 Polish Pairs Speedway Championship was the 1979 edition of the Polish Pairs Speedway Championship. The final was held on 5 July at Gniezno.

Team

Team Speedway Polish Championship
The 1979 Team Speedway Polish Championship was the 1979 edition of the Team Polish Championship. 

Unia Leszno won the gold medal. The team included Mariusz Okoniewski and Roman Jankowski.

First League

Second League

References

Poland Individual
Poland Team
Speedway
1979 in Polish speedway